Siebel may refer to:

Companies  
 Siebel, a German aircraft manufacturer founded in 1937 in Halle an der Saale
 Siebel Systems, a software company principally engaged in the design, development, marketing and support of customer relationship management (CRM) applications.

People 
 Fritz Siebel (1913 – 1991), an Austrian American illustrator
 Jennifer Siebel Newsom (born 1974), an American documentary filmmaker and First Lady of California since 2019
 Pablo Siebel (born 1954), a Chilean painter
 Paul Siebel (born 1937), an American singer-songwriter and guitarist
 Thomas Siebel, a business executive
 Wigand Siebel (born 1929), a German sociologist
 a character in the opera Faust

Siebels may refer to:
 George G. Siebels, Jr. (born 1913), the first Republican Mayor of Birmingham, Alabama
 Jon Siebels, (born 1979), the guitarist in the band Eve 6